Jardinella is a genus of small freshwater snails, aquatic gastropod mollusks in the family Tateidae.

Distribution 
The genus Jardinella is endemic to Queensland, Australia. Jardinella species live in four spring "supergroups" in the Great Artesian Basin: Springsure, Barcaldine, Springvale and Eulo. Jardinella tumorosa lives in Little Mulgrave River.

Species
Species within the genus Jardinella include:
Jardinella thaanumi (Pilsbry, 1900)
Jardinella tullyensis Ponder, 1991
Jardinella tumorosa Ponder, 1991
Species brought into synonymy
Jardinella acuminata Ponder & Clark, 1990: synonym of Edgbastonia acuminata (Ponder & G. A. Clark, 1990)
Jardinella carnarvonensis Ponder & Clark, 1990: synonym of Carnarvoncochlea carnarvonensis (Ponder & Clark, 1990) (basionym)
Jardinella colmani Ponder & Clark, 1990: synonym of Edgbastonia colmani (Ponder & G. A. Clark, 1990)
Jardinella coreena Ponder & Clark, 1990: synonym of Edgbastonia coreena (Ponder & G. A. Clark, 1990) (basionym)
Jardinella corrugata Ponder & Clark, 1990: synonym of Edgbastonia corrugata (Ponder & G. A. Clark, 1990) (basionym)
Jardinella edgbastonensis Ponder & Clark, 1990: synonym of Edgbastonia edgbastonensis (Ponder & G. A. Clark, 1990) (basionym)
Jardinella eulo Ponder & Clark, 1990: synonym of Eulodrobia eulo (Ponder & G. A. Clarke, 1990) (basionym)
Jardinella exigua Ponder & Clark, 1990: synonym of Carnarvoncochlea exigua (Ponder & Clark, 1990) (basionym)
Jardinella isolata Ponder & Clark, 1990: synonym of Springvalia isolata (Ponder & G. A. Clark, 1990) (basionym)
Jardinella jesswiseae Ponder & Clark, 1990: synonym of Edgbastonia jesswisseae (Ponder & G. A. Clark, 1990) (basionym)
Jardinella pallida Ponder & Clark, 1990: synonym of Edgbastonia pallida (Ponder & G. A. Clark, 1990) (basionym)
Jardinella zeidlerorum Ponder & Clark, 1990: synonym of Edgbastonia zeidlerorum (Ponder & G. A. Clark, 1990) (basionym)

References

 Bank, R. A. (2017). Classification of the Recent freshwater/brackish Gastropoda of the World. Last update: January 24th, 2018

External links
 Ponder, W. F.; Clark, G. A. (1990). A radiation of hydrobiid snails in threatened artesian springs in western Queensland. Records of the Australian Museum. 42(3): 301-363
 Ponder, W. F. (1991). The eastern seaboard species of Jardinella (Mollusca: Gastropoda: Hydrobiidae), Queensland rainforest-inhabiting freshwater snails derived from the west. Records of the Australian Museum. 43(3): 275-289
 Ponder W., Zhang W.-H. [Wei-Hong, Hallan A. & Shea M. (2019). New taxa of Tateidae (Caenogastropoda, Truncatelloidea) from springs associated with the Great Artesian Basin and Einasleigh Uplands, Queensland, with the description of two related taxa from eastern coastal drainages. Zootaxa. 4583(1): 1-67]

 
Tateidae
Freshwater molluscs of Oceania